Jazz Concert is a 1963 live album by George Shearing and his quintet, recorded 16 February 1963 at the Santa Monica Civic Auditorium.

Reception

Scott Yanow reviewed the album for Allmusic and wrote that "The most memorable tracks include "Walkin'," "Love Walked In", and a nearly 12-minute rendition of "Love Is Just Around the Corner." Although the group always had a dominant easy-listening sound, a lot of hard-swinging often took place beneath the surface, particularly during their live sets."

Track listing 
 "Walkin'" (Richard Carpenter) - 7:50
 "Love Is Just Around the Corner" (Lewis Gensler, Leo Robin) - 11:50
 "I Cover the Waterfront" (Johnny Green, Edward Heyman) - 6:28
 "Love Walked In" (George Gershwin, Ira Gershwin) - 5:55
 "There with You" (Dick Garcia) - 4:30
 "Bel Aire" (Ray Bryant) - 4:10

Personnel 
George Shearing - piano
Gary Burton - vibraphone
John Gray - guitar
Bill Yancey - double bass
Vernel Fournier - drums

References

1963 live albums
Albums recorded at the Santa Monica Civic Auditorium
George Shearing live albums
Capitol Records live albums